Dwyriw is a community in the county of Powys (previously Montgomeryshire), mid Wales.

It is located between two tributaries of the Afon Rhiw, hence the name ("Two Rhiw Rivers"), south-west of Llanfair Caereinion.

Historic buildings nearby include Capel Coffa Lewis Evan in Adfa and St. Mary's Church, Llanllugan.

The villages within the community include Adfa (the largest settlement), Llanllugan, Cefn Coch and Llanwyddelan.

According to the 2011 Census the population of Dwyriw was 571, including 474 adults over 16 years old.

The community elects eight community councillors to Dwyriw Community Council, from the wards of Llanwyddelan and Llanllugan.

The area formerly had an abbey.

References

Communities in Powys
Villages in Powys
Montgomeryshire